Nephroceuticals is a pharmaceutical company based out of Miamisburg, Ohio. Founded in 2008 Nephroceuticals develops and manufactures nutritional supplements that promote health in people with kidney disease and heart disease.

History

Nephroceuticals was founded in 2008 by Dr. John R. Wigneswaran and is based in Miamisburg, Ohio.

May 19, 2009, the National Kidney Foundation announces a partnership with Nephroceuticals that is based on nutrition and early detection for kidney disease. The partnership includes developing and distributing print and online educational materials and supports the foundation's nationwide early detection initiative, the Kidney Early Evaluation Program (KEEP).

December 11, 2009 Nephroceuticals starts marketing a daily multivitamin for people with kidney disease: ProRenal QD with Omega 3 and ProRenal Vital.

March 9, 2012 Nephroceuticals provides a notice of its intent to raise $4 million within a year to add employees and develop new products. Included are plans to develop a supplement for cancer patients, and to launch a multivitamin focused on those with gastrointestinal problems.

Patents and Trademarks
Summary of Marks

References

External links
National Kidney Foundation website
American Journal of Kidney Diseases

Health care companies based in Ohio
Pharmaceutical companies of the United States
Health care companies established in 2008
American companies established in 2008